Franziska Liebhardt (born 5 January 1982) is a Paralympic athlete from Germany.  She competes in throwing events in the F37 classification and in the long jump in the T37 classification. , she holds the women's F37 world record in the shot put, which she set whilst competing at the 2016 Summer Paralympics in Rio de Janeiro.

References

External links 
 
 

1982 births
Living people
German female shot putters
German female long jumpers
Paralympic athletes of Germany
Paralympic gold medalists for Germany
Paralympic silver medalists for Germany
Paralympic medalists in athletics (track and field)
Athletes (track and field) at the 2016 Summer Paralympics
Medalists at the 2016 Summer Paralympics
World record holders in Paralympic athletics
Athletes from Berlin